Bakila is a Bazaar in Hazigonj Thana, Chandpur District in the Chittagong Division of eastern Bangladesh. Many big cattle markets sit on Thursdays.  This cattle market is a very old market.  This market is contributing to the revenue of the government

References

Populated places in Chandpur District